Anna Van Hooft (born April 28, 1986) is a Canadian actress. She is known for her role as Princess Aura 2007 TV adaptation of Flash Gordon.

She also had a recurring role as a voice actress in the animated series Trollz.

Filmography

Film

Television

References

External links
 
 

Canadian film actresses
Canadian television actresses
Canadian voice actresses
Living people
Canadian people of Dutch descent
1986 births